Dual is a 2008 American independent Western drama film.  It was directed by Steven R. Monroe and written by and starring Michael Worth.

Plot
Luke Twain is a drifter who finds a small settlement where everyone has been killed.  Trying to do the right thing and solve the gruesome mystery, he finds himself taking a journey into fear and death.

Cast
Michael Worth   ...Luke Twain
Tim Thomerson   ...Jared Deston
Karen Kim   ...Ember
Margot Farley   ...Mother

External links
 

2008 films
2000s English-language films
American independent films
2008 Western (genre) films
American Western (genre) films
Films directed by Steven R. Monroe
2008 independent films
2008 drama films
2000s American films